Majdan is a village in Serbia. It is situated in the Novi Kneževac municipality, in the North Banat District, Vojvodina province. The village has a Hungarian ethnic majority (85.95%) and its population numbering 292 people (2002 census).

Name
"Majdan" (мајдан) is a Serbian word for quarry (Hungarian word with same meaning is "majdán"). The word "majdan" has Turkish roots like many other words that came from period of administration of the Ottoman Empire.

See also
List of places in Serbia
List of cities, towns and villages in Vojvodina

External links
History of Majdan

Novi Kneževac
Populated places in Serbian Banat
Populated places in North Banat District